Mykola Zuyenko is a Ukrainian retired footballer.

Career
Mykola Zuyenko graduate of the Zorya Luhansk club, where he started his football career in 1989. On March 7, 1992, he made his debut in the High League in a match against Dniper Dnipropetrovsk (0: 2). In the summer of 1992 he was invited to Dynamo Kiev. In early 2004 he moved to Metałurha Zaporozhye, and in the summer he moved to Nywy Vinnitsa. In 1996-2002 he defended the colors of Prykarpattia Ivano-Frankivsk. In the meantime, he played on loan in local bands: FK Tyśmienica, Enerhetyk Bursztyn and Czornohora Ivano-Frankivsk. In the summer of 2002 he became a footballer of Desna Chernihiv. The following summer he changed the club to Techno-Centr Rohatyn. At the beginning of 2004, Podillya Khmelnytskyi moved to Podilla, after which he ended his football career in the Kazakh club Ordabasy Shymkent in Kazakhstan.

Honours
Dynamo Kyiv
 Ukrainian Premier League: 1992–93

Nyva Vinnytsia
 Ukrainian Cup: Runner-Up 1995–96

References

External links 
 Mykola Zuyenko footballfacts.ru
 Mykola Zuyenko allplayers.in.ua

1972 births
Living people
FC Desna Chernihiv players
Ukrainian footballers
Ukrainian Premier League players
Ukrainian First League players
Ukrainian Second League players
Ukrainian expatriate sportspeople in Kazakhstan
Expatriate footballers in Kazakhstan
Association football defenders